Inverurie Loco Works Football Club are a senior semi-professional football club from Inverurie, Aberdeenshire, Scotland, who currently play in the Scottish Highland Football League (SHFL).

The club was founded in 1903 by workmen from the Great North of Scotland Railway (GNSR) who had their Locomotive, and Carriage and Wagon Workshops in Inverurie, hence from where the football club got its name. On National Railway Company 'Grouping' in 1923, the GNSR became part of the London & North Eastern Railway, one of the UK's big four railway companies at that time, and the football club lived on. The Locomotive Workshops themselves were formally closed in 1970 on the forming of British Rail Engineering Limited (BREL), a wholly owned subsidiary of the British Railways Board at that time.

Despite the closure, Inverurie Loco Works F.C. continued to play. Having competed in the Aberdeenshire and North East Junior Leagues for many years, they became a senior club in 2001 when their application to join the SHFL was successful.

History
Rising up from successful years in junior football, in 2001 the Locos applied for membership of the Highland League and were successful. In the 2003–04 season, the Locos came second in the league, they then went a further two seasons in a row in second place. In 2005, they first got their hands on silverware by winning the Scottish Qualifying Cup, then repeated the feat the next year. They also won the Aberdeenshire Shield after being runners up three times before winning the trophy. Then they won the Fosters Cup (League Cup) twice in two years, in 2007–08 and 2008–09. They also won the SFA North Region Challenge Cup in 2008–09.

In the 2008–09 Scottish Cup, the club were paired with Scottish Premier League side Motherwell at home. They reached the fourth round of the competition that season. After four postponements, the match was finally played at the fifth time of asking. Despite a capacity crowd watching, the Highland League outfit could not prevent a 3–0 loss to their top-flight opponents.

Harlaw Park 
Harlaw Park is the Inverurie Loco Works ground; it has a capacity of 2,500 (250 seated).

Staff

Coaching
Manager: Andy Low
Head of Youth Development: Gary Jamieson

Boardroom
Chairman: Mike Macaulay
 Vice Chairman Graeme Hay 
Treasurer: James Porter
Club Secretary: Billy Thomson

Honours

Senior
Highland League Cup:
Winners: 2007–08,  2008–09

Aberdeenshire Shield:
Winners: 2003–04, 2013–14, 2016–17

Scottish Qualifying Cup (North):
Winners: 2004–05, 2005–06

SFA North Region Challenge Cup:
Winners: 2008–09

Aberdeenshire League:
Winners: 2018–19, 2019–20

Junior
North East Junior League champions: 1992–93, 1995–96, 1997–98
Aberdeen & District League champions (16): 1924–25, 1925–26, 1928–29, 1929–30, 1930–31, 1931–32, 1932–33, 1934–35, 1935–36, 1936–37, 1942–43, 1945–46, 1954–55, 1959–60, 1960–61, 1961–62
North East Regional Cup winners: 1995–96, 2000–01
Aberdeen & District League Cup winners: 1927–28, 1928–29, 1929–30, 1931–32, 1945–46
North East League Cup: 1986–87, 1988–89, 1991–92
McLeman Cup winners: 1928–29, 1951–52, 1968–69
Archibald Cup winners (11): 1928–29, 1932–33, 1937–38, 1938–39, 1939–40, 1954–55, 1960–61, 1961–62, 1968–69, 1980–81, 1999–2000 
North Drybrough Cup winners: 1968–69
Duthie Cup: 1928–29, 1932–33, 1933–34, 1935–36, 1939–40, 1960–61
Aberdeen County Trophy (10): 1912–13, 1913–14, 1934–35, 1935–36, 1939–40, 1942–43, 1944–45, 1954–55, 1960–61, 1961–62
Jimmy Gibb Memorial Trophy: 1995–96, 1997–98
Scottish record holders for most goals per game in a season, 6.64 goals per game (146 goals in 22 games), 1945-46 Aberdeen & District Junior League

References

External links
 Official website

 
Football clubs in Scotland
Highland Football League teams
Scottish Junior Football Association clubs
Association football clubs established in 1903
1903 establishments in Scotland
Football in Aberdeenshire
Inverurie
Railway association football teams in Scotland